Leandro Okabe de Oliveira Bulhões, born on June 1, 1985, is a model of Japanese Brazilian descent.

He began his modeling career in Asia, mostly in Malaysia, Singapore, Thailand and Hong Kong and was then discovered by an agency in Brazil. He was Terra's "The Boy" model in 2007. He is a physical education student from São Paulo, Brazil.

References

Brazilian male models
Living people
Brazilian people of Japanese descent
People from São Paulo
Brazilian expatriates in Malaysia
Brazilian expatriates in Singapore
Brazilian expatriates in Thailand
Brazilian expatriates in Hong Kong
Year of birth missing (living people)